A shabnama is a pamphlet communicating warnings or direction, which are surreptitiously distributed.

Shabnama have been found throughout Iranian history. An early 20th century example would be following the Persian Constitutional Revolution, when shabnameh were distributed in Tehran decrying the occupation of parts of Iranian territory by Russian troops, and against the changing of the legal examination laws.

See also
Night letter
Samizdat - self-published surreptitiously distributed dissident literature in the Soviet era

References

Further reading
The Taliban Insurgency and an Analysis of Shabnamah (Night Letters). Thomas H. Johnson, Small Wars and Insurgencies Vol. 18, No. 3, 317–344, September 2007

Persian Constitutional Revolution
Propaganda in Afghanistan
Propaganda in Iran
Communications in Afghanistan
Communications in Iran
Propaganda books and pamphlets
Persian words and phrases